Andrew Johnston House is a historic home located at Pearisburg, Giles County, Virginia. The central block was built in 1829, and is a two-story, five bay, central-passage plan, brick house over a low basement in the Federal style. It features a one-story, flat-roofed front portico topped by a balustrade and supported by two Ionic order and two Tuscan order columns. Also on the property is a small contributing outbuilding that was built as a doctor's office about 1857. The building houses the Giles County Historical Society, which uses it as a museum and research center.

It was listed on the National Register of Historic Places in 1993.

References

External links
Giles County Historical Society website

History museums in Virginia
Houses on the National Register of Historic Places in Virginia
Houses completed in 1829
Federal architecture in Virginia
Houses in Giles County, Virginia
National Register of Historic Places in Giles County, Virginia
Museums in Giles County, Virginia